Adang is a Papuan language spoken on the island of Alor in Indonesia. The language is agglutinative. The Hamap dialect is sometimes treated as a separate language; on the other hand, Kabola, which is sociolinguistically distinct, is sometimes included. Adang, Hamap and Kabola are considered a dialect chain. Adang is endangered as fewer speakers raise their children in Adang, instead opting for Indonesian.

Phonology

Consonants 

Notes:
 Post-alveolar [t͡ʃ, d͡ʒ, ɲ] are palatalized versions of their alveolar counterparts [t, d, n] and occur when following a diphthong ending in high front vowel [i]. The [i] has been deleted in some cases, resulting in new minimal pairs contrasting alveolar and post-alveolar variants. The extent of this sound change differs between speakers and Robinson and Haan only consider [d͡ʒ] to have become a fully separate phoneme. Because it is the result of a process limited the syllable coda, this new phoneme only occurs syllable-finally.
 In certain dialects /l/ is deleted following a diphthong ending in [i].
 /g/ occurs in syllable-initial position, but the only cases in which it does syllable-finally are onomatopoeic forms.
 /s/ only occurs syllable-finally in loanwords.
 /f/ never occurs in syllable-final position.

Vowels 

Diphthongs are /ai/, /oi/, /eu/, /au/ and /ou/. Vowel sequences that begin with a lax mid vowel (i.e. /ɔ/ or /ɛ/) cannot be diphthongs and are always disyllabic.

Phonotactics 
Adang syllable structure is (C)V(C). V can either be a monophthong or a diphthong. C can be almost any consonant. Exceptions are /f/, which never occurs in syllable final position, and /d͡ʒ/, which only ever occurs in final position. /s/ and /g/ only occur syllable-finally in specific categories of words (i.e. loanwords and onomatopoeic words, resp.).

Grammar

Syntax 
Clauses in Adang are predicate-final: intransitive verbal predicates have Subject-Verb order and transitive predicates follow Agent-Patient-Verb order. In ditransitive constructions the theme precedes the recipient. Adang has accusative alignment. Some sentence examples:

A nominal predicate also follows the subject (note that Adang does not use a copula):

Negation 
A clause is negated by placing negator nanɛ or nɛnɛ after the predicate. Besides nanɛ there are two negative particles: ʔɛ and haʔai. ʔɛ is used to limit the scope of negator nanɛ by placing ʔɛ in front of the negated element. In this case nanɛ must still succeed the predicate:

Nanɛ may also be used on its own for rules or general prohibitions. Alternatively, ʔɛ at the end of a clause expresses a negative imperative (without nanɛ). Compare:

To make a negative imperative more polite add haʔai to the beginning of the sentence. Lastly, the verb aʔai negates existence or possession.

Questions 
Adang question words are anɔ ‘who’, naba ‘what’, tarɔ ‘where’, tarɔni ‘how/why’ and den ‘how many/when’. They remain in situ. Depending on whether they replace a subject or an object they can be followed by the subject focus marker so or the object focus marker fe.

Yes-no questions are distinguished from declarative sentences by rising intonation on the last syllable.

Nouns 
The structure of the Adang noun phrase:(possessor + possessive.pronoun) N V CLF V numeral quantifier REL DEM/DEF        (Robinson & Haan 2014:242)

Determiners and demonstratives 
A demonstrative or the definite determiner ho is placed at the end of the noun phrase. The demonstrative paradigm shows a distinction between proximal (hɔʔɔ) and distal, and distal demonstratives further distinguish between location above the speaker (hɛtɔ), below the speaker (hɛpɔ) and level with the speaker (hɛmɔ).

Possession 
Nouns are divided into three classes according to their behavior concerning possession: the first class must with occur possessive pronominal prefixes at all times (inalienable), the second never occurs with possessive pronominal prefixes and instead uses independent possessive pronouns (alienable), and the third only occurs with possessive pronominal prefixes when possessed. The prefix sets of the first and third classes are different. Next to the independent possessive pronouns of alienable nouns, Adang has a set of contrastive possessive pronouns. These may occur before or without alienable pronouns, and also together with possessive prefixes. They can also occur without a possessed noun.

Attributes 
Adang uses intransitive verbs to modify nouns, as it has no separate word class of adjectives. In the noun phrase they may occur before or after the classifier (CLF in noun phrase template above). Locative or directional verbs also occur in this position (see Location and direction).

Classifiers 
Classifiers occur between a noun and a number larger than one. They classify nouns by their size, shape and flexibility, but some nouns may take different classifiers to gain different interpretations. Out of the many Adang classifiers, paʔ is the most common and is used for many different kinds of objects.

Other examples include pir (used for small, round objects), beh (flat, flexible objects) and ʔafail (small, rigid objects).

Pronouns 
Adang has many independent pronouns, organized in six paradigms. Two of these paradigms are of independent possessive pronouns, one occurring with alienable nouns and another fulfilling a contrastive function in combination with alienable nouns (with or without regular possessive pronoun) or inalienable nouns (with a possessive prefix). Contrastive possessive pronouns are also used without a noun. Besides regular possessive pronouns and contrastive possessive pronouns (see Possession), the four other paradigms are: subject pronouns, object pronouns, numbered pronouns and alone pronouns.

Subject pronouns 
Subject pronouns are used for the subjects of transitive or intransitive verbs. They can be used to refer to any animate subject, human or non-human. Only in very limited circumstances can they refer to inanimate subjects.

Object pronouns 
An object pronoun indicates the object of a transitive verb. Some verbs do not use object pronouns, but use prefixes instead (see Object prefixes). Object pronouns and object prefixes cannot co-occur. Supi can precede third person ʔari to make clear that it had plural meaning.

Numbered pronouns 
A numbered pronoun is used when a pronoun is modified by a number greater than one or the question word den (‘how many?’). It can be used for both subjects and objects, either on its own or following a regular subject pronoun or object pronoun.

Alone pronouns 
Alone pronouns refer to a person or a group of people doing something on their own. They can refer to the subject or the object of a clause. If an alone pronoun refers to a subject it may co-index a preceding argument, but this is not necessary. If it indicates an object it has to occur together with an object pronoun.

Verbs 
Verbs in Adang may take pronominal and/or valency-increasing prefixes. Pronominal prefixes mostly serve to mark objects on (di)transitive verbs. For some verbs object-marking is obligatory, while for others it is optional, and some verbs are never marked for object. Verbs that do take object-prefixes are a closed class. Whether a verb selects a pronominal object prefix or an independent object pronoun is a lexical property of the verb, and the two cannot occur together. Even so object-marking is influenced somewhat by the animacy of the object. It is not necessary for a marked object to be animate, or for an animate object to be marked on the verb, but in the majority of cases object-marking goes together with an animate object.

The transitive verbs that always remain unprefixed include verbs that only appear with inanimate objects, verbs that only appear with animate objects, and verbs that may appear with either.

There are four series of pronominal prefixes (some of which also increase a verb’s valency), and two separate prefixes that increase valency. 

Adang makes use of serial verb constructions and also uses verbs to indicate direction and location.

Pronominal prefixes

Object prefixes 
Some transitive verbs that select object prefixes instead of object pronouns, cannot occur without them. While the majority of these verbs have animate objects, a few verbs that always take inanimate objects belong to this class. Some verbs that may have objects of varying animacy are also included. Example of an object prefix:

It is possible for a verb to select an object prefix for an animate object, but remain unprefixed when it has an inanimate object. Compare: -puɲ ‘catch/hold someone’ and puɲ ‘hold something’.

Allative prefixes 
With an allative prefix a verbs valency is increased by one argument. It indicates movement toward that argument. There are two sets of allative prefixes. Of the two allative paradigms the first set can turn verbs from intransitive to transitive, from transitive to ditransitive. The second set is only found on three verbs: lap ‘search’, lɔfɛ ‘call’ and tain ‘release’. An example from each set of prefixes:

Set 1: 

Set 2:

Ablative prefixes 
Ablative prefixes also increase the valency of a verb to indicate movement away from its referent. This movement may be physical or metaphorical. The collection of verbs that can have an ablative prefix is very limited and consists of five verbs: papaɲ ‘imitate’, mala ‘shy’, baroc ‘afraid’, tafuniŋ ‘hide’ and tɛʔɛŋ ‘run’.

Valency-increasing prefixes

Applicative prefix 
Applicative prefix u- increases a verb’s valency by introducing a theme to a sentence. Other possible roles of an added argument are goals or beneficiaries. If it occurs together with a pronominal prefix, the applicative suffix precedes the pronominal suffix. Example:

Causative prefix 
The causative prefix adds a ‘causer’ to a proposition, thereby increasing a verb’s valency. There are only ten intransitive verbs that may carry a causative prefix. These include muj ‘fall down’, mih ‘sit’ and tɔh ‘stand’. The prefix almost always occurs together with a pronominal prefix, which precedes it. The only exception is ʔɔl ‘fall over’. An example:

Serial verb constructions 
Serial verb constructions are very common in Adang. Serial verb constructions consist of multiple verbs combined into a single predicate, and share arguments and features such as aspect and negation. Symmetrical serial verb constructions consist solely of verbs from open classes, while an SVC is asymmetrical when it contains one verb from a closed class, which must precede the other verb(s). Symmetrical SVCs describe a sequence of events or the manner of an event.

Asymmetrical serial verb constructions have several different uses, which are detailed below.

Comitative SVCs 
Comitative constructions use the verb -ra ‘be with’ before the main verb.

Causative SVCs 
In causative constructions the causative verb also precedes the main verb. Three verbs can be used in a causative SVC. These are -nɔʔ ‘affect’, -hou ‘command’ and -ɛn ‘give’. -ɛn means ‘help’ in a causative SVC:

Directional SVCs 
In a directional serial verb construction an intransitive directional verb (e.g. sam ‘go (far)’, ma ‘come’) indicates the direction of an event. The directional verb precedes the main, open-class verb.

Instrumental SVCs 
The instrumental serial verb construction is the only way in Adang to introduce an instrument argument. It uses the verb puin ‘hold’:

Theme SVCs 
A theme may be introduced by adding med ‘take’ before the open-class verb. While this construction is common in everyday speech, the verb med is entirely optional.

Location and direction 
Verbs are also used to indicate direction or location, often in serial verb constructions. They cannot be intransitive, as they must have a subject and a location argument.

The verb lɛ ‘to, towards’ also forms a part of directional and locational compound verbs, for instance talɛ ‘up on’ and adaŋlɛ ‘away from the speaker toward the mountain’.

Locative deictics in Adang are considered to be verbs, because they can occur in serial verb constructions and modify nouns. Locative deictics distinguish between proximal (ʔɔŋ ‘here’), distal above the speaker (tɔŋ ‘there (above)’), distal level with the speaker (mɔŋ ‘there (level)’) and distal below the speaker (pɔŋ ‘there (below)’). Deictics may stand alone as predicates. Examples:

Aspect 
Adang expresses aspect with aspectual particles at the end of the predicate. Aspects that are grammatically marked in Adang are progressive, perfective and inceptive. The progressive particle is eh, the perfective particle is am, and the inceptive particle is eham. These particles do not have to be combined with a verbal predicate; they may also be used with a nominal predicate.

Kinship terms 
Adang kinship terminology features no obligatory distinction between siblings, parallel-cousins and cross-cousins. There is a distinction between younger and older siblings/cousins, respectively diʔ and matu, and a single term for the same group: -uding. These terms are all gender-neutral, but can be modified with ob ‘female’ or lote ‘male’ (e.g. no’uding lote ‘my sister’).

For biological siblings matu or diʔ is preferred, but -uding is also acceptable. Conversely, parallel-cousins are generally called -uding but may sometimes be called matu/diʔ. Cross-cousins are almost exclusively referred to as -uding.

Notes

Further reading
 
 Robinson, Laura C. & Haan, John W. (2014). Adang. In Schapper, Antoinette (Ed.). The Papuan Languages of Timor, Alor and Pantar: Volume 1: Sketch Grammars. Walter de Gruyter. pp. 23–96.

External links

 Listen to a sample of Adang from Global Recordings Network
 Adang Collection at The Language Archive

Agglutinative languages
Languages of Indonesia
Alor–Pantar languages
Alor Archipelago